Aidan Merivale Crawley  (10 April 1908 – 3 November 1993) was a British journalist, television executive and editor, and politician. He was a member of both of Britain's major political parties: the Labour Party and Conservative Party, and was elected to the House of Commons as a Labour MP from 1945 to 1951, and as a Conservative MP from 1962 to 1967.

Education
Crawley was educated at Harrow School and Trinity College, Oxford. He played cricket for both Harrow and for Oxford University Cricket Club. He scored 87 in the 1926 Eton v Harrow match at Lord's, an innings which Wisden described as "widely regarded as the best innings in the match for many year", and he was described in the same publication as a "beautiful player". In 1928 he set a new record for runs scored in a season for Oxford with 1,137 runs scored, and in 1929 scored 204 against Northamptonshire.

Life and career
Crawley had a varied career, playing first-class cricket, serving in the armed forces, acting as a Member of Parliament for two political parties, making documentary films and serving as the first chairman of London Weekend Television.

Cricket career

Crawley made his first-class cricket debut in May 1927, playing for Oxford University against Harlequins. Later the same year he made his County Championship debut for Kent County Cricket Club against Worcestershire as an amateur cricketer. The bulk of Crawley's first-class cricket career was in the late 1920s and early 1930s. He made at least ten first-class appearances in each year between 1927 and 1932 and made a total of 87 first-class appearances, the majority during this period. He played a total of 39 times for Oxford and 33 for Kent as well as eight times for Marylebone Cricket Club (MCC) as well as making a few appearances for other teams such as the Free Foresters.

He played only six more first-class matches after the end of the 1932 season, four of which took place after the Second World War whilst he was a sitting MP. He also made four Minor Counties Championship appearances for Buckinghamshire in 1948 and was president of MCC in 1972-73 and the chairman of the National Cricket Association for seven years, during which time he was one of the driving forces behind the establishment of the National Village Cricket Championship.

Services career
He joined the Auxiliary Air Force in 1936, and was a trained fighter pilot at start of the Second World War.  After serving on night patrols over the English Channel he was sent ostensibly as an assistant air attaché to Turkey in April 1940, cover for intelligence work in the Balkans in Yugoslavia and Bulgaria, being smuggled out of Sofia when the Germans invaded the latter country in March 1941.  Subsequently, assigned to 73 Squadron in Egypt, he was shot down in July 1941 near besieged Tobruk and was taken prisoner of war.  He remained in Germany, despite escape attempts, latterly at Stalag Luft III.

Parliamentary career
He was Labour Member of Parliament for Buckingham from 1945 to 1951, when he lost to the Conservative candidate Frank Markham, himself an ex-Labour MP. He was Under-Secretary of State for Air in Clement Attlee's Labour Government. Having left the Labour Party in 1957, in 1962, he was elected to Parliament as a Conservative, winning the by-election in West Derbyshire.  He held the seat through two general elections, before resigning in 1967 to become Chairman of London Weekend Television where he remained until 1973.

Media career
In 1955, he was the first editor-in-chief of Independent Television News and was responsible for introducing American-style newscasters to British media and pledged to transform television's attitudes to politicians. He left ITN after a row when the company tried to trim down the news operations and rejoined the BBC.

Crawley wrote several books, including biographies of Konrad Adenauer and Charles De Gaulle.

 De Gaulle: A Biography (London: Collins, 1969)
 Escape from Germany 1939-1945
 Spoils of the War: The Rise of Western Germany 1945-1972
 Patterns of Government in Africa
 Leap before you look: a memoir, 1988.

Family
Crawley was the second son of the Rev. (Arthur) Stafford Crawley, Canon of Windsor, and the former Anstice Katherine Gibbs (usually known as Nancy), sixth of the ten children of Antony and Janet Gibbs of Tyntesfield, Somerset. His paternal grandfather was George Baden Crawley (1833–1879), a successful railway contractor and his wife Inez.

Stafford Crawley was the brother-in-law of the Earl of Cavan and Crawley's mother was related to the Lords Wraxall, of Tyntesfield and the Lords Aldenham and Hunsdon. Stafford Crawley was chaplain to the Archbishop of York at Bishopthorpe and later Canon of St George's Chapel, Windsor. The Crawleys had three sons and two daughters, of whom Aidan was the middle son. A daughter Anstice, Lady Goodman (see below), was also prominent in public life.

Marriage and issue
In 1945, he married the sometime war correspondent Virginia Cowles (24 August 1910 – 6 September 1983), daughter of the controversial society doctor Edward Spencer Cowles MD, with whom he had 3 children.

Crawley suffered several tragedies.  His wife died in 1983 in a road accident near Biarritz in France. Five years later, he lost both his sons in a plane crash whilst they were travelling together to their sister's 40th birthday party, leaving young children and widows who were seven months pregnant. He then lost heavily in the Lloyd's crash and at the time of his death, Crawley was virtually penniless.

He was survived by his daughter Harriet, his two widowed daughters-in-law and six grandchildren:
 Andrew Hayward Crawley (1947−1988), married Sarah Lawrence in 1986 and had one son and a posthumous daughter.
 Randall Stafford Crawley (1950–1988), who married Marita Georgina Phillips in 1982. Their two sons (the younger Galen born after his death) and a daughter. His widow Marita remarried Andrew Knight in 2006.
 Harriet Spencer Crawley (b. 1948), a successful author and former television presenter of "Collecting Now", married Gleb Shestakov in 1993 and then Julian Ayer in around 2001. Ayer, whom she met in 1999, was the adoptive son of the philosopher Sir Alfred Jules Ayer. They had no children although Harriet had one son in 1987: Harriet unsuccessfully fought the Brent East Constituency in the 1987 general election, she lost to Labour veteran Ken Livingstone. 
Spencer Henry Crawley (b.1987) who played one first-class cricket match for Oxford University.

Notable relatives

 Crawley's sister was Anstice, Lady Goodman (7 December 1911 – 4 January 2001), whose marriage to Sir Victor Goodman was childless.
 Crawley's niece Penelope Anstice Crawley (b. 1950) married 1971 Lord Guernsey, now 12th Earl of Aylesford (b. 1947), the heir to the 11th Earl of Aylesford and has issue, including one son.  Her husband succeeded to the earldom on 12 February 2008, and her son is now styled Lord Guernsey.  This is not the first notable marriage for a Crawley female; her great-aunt Caroline Inez Crawley (d. 1920, without issue) was first wife of Field Marshal the 10th Earl of Cavan.
 An ancestress Matilda Crawley-Boevey (1817–1877), of the Crawley-Boevey baronets married William Gibbs of Tyntesfield and Clyst St. George, and had issue, seven children, of whom four are listed in the Plantagenet Roll.<ref>Marquis de Ruvigny de Raineval et al.[https://books.google.com/books?id=w9UYYThhRIQC&pg=PA155&lpg=PA155&dq=%22George+Baden+Crawley%22&source=web&ots=mn5pa3SiDe&sig=FchROnbsAi3YcvIY78911tdYO2A&hl=en&sa=X&oi=book_result&resnum=1&ct=result#PPA150,M1 Plantagenet Roll: Clarence Volume] p. 150. Originally published: London : T.C. & E.C. Jack, 1905. Reprinted by Genealogical Publishing Com, 1994. Retrieved 10 December 2008</ref> Her granddaughter Anstice Katharine Gibbs married a Crawley cousin (Arthur Stafford Crawley) in 1903, and was mother of Aidan Merivale Crawley.  Anstice's brother was 1st Baron Wraxall, while close relatives patrilineally were the Lords Aldenham and Hunsdon (now united as of 1939).

Notes

References
Daily Telegraph, 14/06/67

Photograph of Aidan Crawley down the page.
Virginia Cowles, German Wikipedia (in German).

Aidan Crawley from CricketArchive
"After the flood: England witness a triumph of the spirit in Sri Lanka" The Independent, 18 December 2007. Describes Harriet Ayer's efforts to build a memorial to her husband, and relates some of the family tragedies.

 External links 
 
 Crawley ancestry can be found at the following sources:
 the Plantagenet Roll: Clarence Volume
 the 1895 issue of Debrett's Peerage (archived online).
 Descendants of the Conqueror: Clarence 25. This shows all the descendants of the Crawley-Boevey baronets, starting with the 2nd Baronet and his brothers. Retrieved 10 December 2008.
 Rev. Arthur Stafford Crawley (1876-1948), Canon of Windsor, information in the National Archives.

Further reading
Aidan Crawley. Leap before you look: a memoir'', (HarperCollins Publishers Ltd, 7 April 1988)

1908 births
1993 deaths
20th-century biographers
20th-century English historians
20th-century British male writers
Alumni of Trinity College, Oxford
British World War II fighter pilots
British World War II prisoners of war
British reporters and correspondents
British sportsperson-politicians
Buckinghamshire cricketers
Conservative Party (UK) MPs for English constituencies
English biographers
English cricketers
English television executives
Free Foresters cricketers
Gentlemen cricketers
ITN
Kent cricketers
Labour Party (UK) MPs for English constituencies
Marylebone Cricket Club cricketers
Members of the Order of the British Empire
Members of the Parliament of the United Kingdom for constituencies in Derbyshire
Ministers in the Attlee governments, 1945–1951
Oxford University cricketers
People educated at Harrow School
Presidents of the Marylebone Cricket Club
UK MPs 1945–1950
UK MPs 1950–1951
UK MPs 1959–1964
UK MPs 1964–1966
UK MPs 1966–1970
Military personnel from Kent
World War II prisoners of war held by Germany
People from Benenden
Royal Air Force pilots of World War II
Shot-down aviators
20th-century English businesspeople
American male non-fiction writers